"Khel Deewano Ka") was the official anthem of the 2019 Pakistan Super League, the fourth season of the Pakistan Super League. It has been written and produced by Shuja Haider, and sung by Fawad Khan while it also features rap by Young Desi. It was released on 18 January by HBL Pakistan.

Background
On 29 November 2018, PSL officially hinted at the making of new anthem through the hashtag #KhelDeewanoKa. It was reported on 15 December that the anthem for the fourth season of PSL will be helmed by Shuja Haider and Fawad Khan will sing it, while Young Desi's rap will also be featured. This news was soon confirmed by Khan's manager. Khan, who previously represented the team Islamabad United for three seasons, will not serve as the team's ambassador this time. Haider has previously also collaborated for several songs related to cricket in Pakistan. He told The Express Tribune, "This is the first time I'm composing the PSL anthem" and "I've penned the song as well."

The anthems for previous three seasons were written and performed by Ali Zafar, and for the fourth season he revealed to Geo News that he could not be able to perform due to his busy schedule. He said that he is glad to be a part of PSL, and now others should also be given the chance.

Release
The music video for the anthem was released on Facebook and YouTube simultaneously on 18 January, after an announcement on previous day. It shows the fans with the playcards of their team out of six teams of PSL. Soon on YouTube, it rose up to trending #6 in Pakistan, and it became most-liked PSL anthem.

Fawad Khan and Young Desi also performed on this anthem at the opening ceremony of the fourth season of PSL on 14 February 2019 in Dubai International Stadium.

See also

 List of Pakistan Super League anthems

References

2019 Pakistan Super League
2019
2019 songs